Howard Lee (15 August 1935 – 23 August 2012) was a Bermudian sailor. He competed in the Finn event at the 1976 Summer Olympics.

References

External links
 

1935 births
2012 deaths
Bermudian male sailors (sport)
Olympic sailors of Bermuda
Sailors at the 1976 Summer Olympics – Finn
Place of birth missing